Zygaena lonicerae, the narrow-bordered five-spot burnet,  is a moth of the family Zygaenidae. The species was first described by Theodor Gottlieb von Scheven in 1777.

Subspecies

Zygaena lonicerae lonicerae
Zygaena lonicerae abbastumana Reiss, 1922
Zygaena lonicerae alpiumgigas Verity, 1925
Zygaena lonicerae insularis Tremewan, 1960 (Ireland)
Zygaena lonicerae intermixta Verity, 1925
Zygaena lonicerae jocelynae Tremewan, 1962 (Isle of Skye)
Zygaena lonicerae kalkanensis Reiss, 1932
Zygaena lonicerae latomarginata (Tutt, 1899) (England)
Zygaena lonicerae leonensis Tremewan, 1961
Zygaena lonicerae linnei Reiss, 1922
Zygaena lonicerae microdoxa Dujardin, 1965
Zygaena lonicerae nobilis Navàs, 1924
Zygaena lonicerae silana Burgeff, 1914
Zygaena lonicerae thurneri Holik, 1943
Zygaena lonicerae vivax Verity, 1920

Distribution
This species can be found in most of Europe, from Ireland to Fennoscandia, up to west of China. In the southern Europe the species is widespread from northern and central Spain to Turkey and the Caucasus.

Habitat

Description
The forewings usually show five crimson to vermilion spots and a black basic colour, with a strong bluish or blue-green reflection. The third spot is smaller than the fourth one. Head, thorax and abdomen are black and moderately to strongly hairy. The antennae are long and slender and slightly clavate (club shaped) and tapered. The females are similar to males, but the top of the front wing is slightly rounded and the abdomen and the thorax are less hairy. However this species is very variable. Usually the moth populations in alpine areas are much larger, while those from southern Europe are darker.

Life cycle
The moth flies during daytime from June to early August depending on the location. They suck nectar of the preferred blue violet flowers, such as on field scabious (Knautia arvensis), dove pincushion flower (Scabiosa columbaria), meadow knapweed (Centaurea jacea), panicle knapweed (Centaurea stoebe), creeping thistle (Cirsium arvense), bulbous thistle (Cirsium tuberosum) and ring thistle (Carduus).

The females lay eggs in July on the underside of leaves of the host plants or on plants that grow close to them. The eggs are pale yellow. The caterpillars reach a length of 19 to 28 millimetres. They are bluish green or pale yellow, with long pale hairs and a few rows of almost rectangular black spots.

The larvae feed on various low-growing plants, including Trifolium (Trifolium medium, Trifolium montanum, Trifolium pratense, Trifolium repens)  and Lathyrus species (Lathyrus pratensis, Lathyrus linifolius, Lathyrus sativus), as well as Vicia, Lotus corniculatus, Lotus uliginosus, Onobrychis viciifolia. Larvae and pupae are occasionally parasitized by Tachinidae species (Phryxe magnicornis) and by some species of wasps.

The larvae eat until late summer and early winter, and continue to develop in the following year. At the end of May the caterpillars are fully grown. The not fully grown caterpillars overwinter a second time. The caterpillars pupate in an elongated or spindle-shaped yellowish or white cocoon on grasses and other plants. The colour of pupa  varies from brown to black.

References
 Naumann, C. M. & Tremewan, W. G. (1999). The Western Palaearctic Zygaenidae. 1. Auflage. Apollo Books, Stenstrup
 "Narrow-bordered Five-spot Burnet Zygaena lonicerae (Scheven, 1777)". BioLib. Retrieved 16 December 2019.
 Fauna Europaea

External links

 
 Catalogue of the Lepidoptera of Belgium
 Moths and Butterflies of Europe and North Africa

Zygaena
Moths of Asia
Moths of Europe
Moths described in 1777